Woofferton railway station was a station and railway junction near Woofferton, Shropshire, England, where the Tenbury Railway joined the Shrewsbury and Hereford Railway (S&HR).

The station opened on 6 December 1853 as part of the southern extension of the S&HR from Ludlow to Hereford. It became a junction station in August 1861 when the Tenbury Railway (operated by the S&HR) opened a 5-mile branch line. In August 1864 the GWR-operated Tenbury and Bewdley Railway opened, completing the 'Wyre Forest Line' to Bewdley. In 1889 a bay platform, known as the "Back Platform", was added to serve the Wyre Forest Line. This was accessed via two diamond crossings in the main lines and continued in use until being removed in 1957.

The station closed on 31 July 1961, the same date as the closure of the former Tenbury Railway. The line through the station, the Welsh Marches Line, remains in use.

References

Further reading

Disused railway stations in Shropshire
Former Shrewsbury and Hereford Railway stations
Railway stations in Great Britain opened in 1853
Railway stations in Great Britain closed in 1961
Rail junctions in England